Brewer High School is a public high school in Brewer, Maine, United States. The school uses the Penobscot Ice Arena.

Notable alumni 
 Howie Day, singer-songwriter

References

External links 
 

Public high schools in Maine
Schools in Penobscot County, Maine
Buildings and structures in Brewer, Maine